Silsbee may refer to:

Places
 Silsbee, California
 Silsbee, Texas
 Silsbee, Utah

People with the surname
 Ann Loomis Silsbee, American composer and poet
 Joseph Lyman Silsbee, American architect
 Nathaniel Silsbee, American politician
 Nathaniel Silsbee, Jr., American politician and businessman